James Edward Riley (1880-1938) was an English professional footballer who played as a full back. He played in the Football League for Burnley.

References

English footballers
Association football fullbacks
Burnley F.C. players
English Football League players
1880 births
1938 deaths